Andrew Gregory Grutka (November 17, 1908 – November 11, 1993) was an American prelate of the Roman Catholic Church. He served as first bishop of the Diocese of Gary in Indiana from 1956 to 1984.

Biography

Early life 
Andrew Grutka was born on November 17, 1908, in Joliet, Illinois, the son of Slovak immigrants from Spišská Stará Ves.  He studied for the priesthood at the Pontifical North American College in Rome.  Grutka was ordained a priest on December 5, 1933, by Cardinal Francesco Selvaggiani for the Diocese of Fort Wayne.  Grutka was serving as the pastor of Holy Trinity Parish in Gary, Indiana, on his final pastoral assignment.

Bishop of Gary 
On December 29, 1956, Grutka was named bishop of the newly created Diocese of Gary by Pope Pius XII.  He was consecrated a bishop by Archbishop Amleto Giovanni Cicognani   Bishops John Cody and Leo Pursley were the principal co-consecrators.   From 1962 to 1965, Grutka attended all four sessions of the Second Vatican Council in Rome and was responsible for implementing the council's reforms in the diocese. In 1959, Andrean High School in Merrillville, Indiana, was named for his patron, Andrew the Apostle.

Retirement and legacy 
Pope John Paul II accepted Grutka's resignation as bishop of the Diocese of Gary on July 9, 1984. After his resignation, Grutka remained active in the diocese, ministering to parishioners.

Andrew Grutka died at his home in Valparaiso, Indiana, on November 11, 1993, at age 85.  He was entombed in the east transept of Cathedral of the Holy Angels in Gary.

References

1908 births
1993 deaths
20th-century Roman Catholic bishops in the United States
Participants in the Second Vatican Council
People from Joliet, Illinois
People from Gary, Indiana
Roman Catholic Diocese of Fort Wayne–South Bend
Roman Catholic bishops of Gary
Catholics from Illinois
American people of Slovak descent